Finchville is an unincorporated community in Custer County, Nebraska, United States.

History
A post office was established at Finchville in 1914, and remained in operation until it was discontinued in 1935.

References

Unincorporated communities in Custer County, Nebraska
Unincorporated communities in Nebraska